Jamar Abrams (born June 21, 1989) is an American professional basketball player. He played college basketball at East Carolina from 2007 to 2011.

Professional career
Abrams spent the 2018–19 season with Science City Jena and averaged 12.2 points and 4.6 rebounds per game. On February 4, 2019, he signed in Belarus with Tsmoki-Minsk. On November 26, Abrams left the team after sustaining a severe injury requiring surgery. He signed with ESSM Le Portel on July 9, 2020. Abrams averaged 11.9 points, 3.9 rebounds, and 1.4 assists per game for Poitiers Basket 86. On November 21, 2021, he signed with ADA Blois Basket 41. On February 21, 2022, Abrams signed with Greek club Iraklis for the rest of the season. In 10 games, he averaged 11.7 points, 4.3 rebounds, 1.1 assists and 1.2 steals in 32 minutes per contest.

References

External links
Inception Sports bio 
Eurobasket profile
RealGM profile
ESPN profile
East Carolina Pirates bio
Ballers Abroad profile

1989 births
Living people
American expatriate basketball people in Belarus
American expatriate basketball people in Canada
American expatriate basketball people in France
American expatriate basketball people in Germany
American expatriate basketball people in Greece
American expatriate basketball people in Japan
American expatriate basketball people in Romania
American expatriate basketball people in Slovenia
American men's basketball players
Bambitious Nara players
Basketball players from Richmond, Virginia
BC Tsmoki-Minsk players
BK VEF Rīga players
East Carolina Pirates men's basketball players
ESSM Le Portel players
Giessen 46ers players
Iraklis Thessaloniki B.C. players
KK Zlatorog Laško players
London Lightning players
Maine Red Claws players
Science City Jena players
SCM U Craiova (basketball) players
Shooting guards
Small forwards